Gateway STEM High School (formerly known as Gateway Institute of Technology) is a public magnet high school in St. Louis, Missouri, United States.

History
Gateway opened as John O'Fallon Technical High School in 1956, named in honor of John O'Fallon.  Under its former name it opened in August 1992, in response to a court order mandating the establishment of a high technology magnet school. The school integrates a strong academic curriculum emphasizing mathematics and science with career preparation in highly technical fields. Accelerated and advanced placement courses are available for students. Inquiry, innovation, creativity and exploration are encouraged throughout the school. In June 2012 The School was renamed as Gateway STEM High School or Gateway Science Technology Engineering and Mathematics High School.

Gateway was one of ten schools recognized as a New American High School by the United States Department of Education in 1996. Gateway serves as a model school and is visited regularly by educators from the U.S. and elsewhere. The school also has the long time Music and Band instructor Steven Hill who has been at the school since its opening in 1992.

Student body
The school has 970 students, who are accepted on a lottery basis.  Approximately 200 of the students have disabilities, including severe orthopedic disabilities, learning disabilities, and behavior challenges. Gateway accepts gifted students.

Academics
At the ninth and tenth grade level students are in 'houses' of 85 to 100 students supported by four teachers (covering English, social studies, math, and science, respectively) and a counselor. The school is designed to integrate academic and technological education in career clusters that require students to have a strong background in mathematics and science. All the students take a broad mathematics curriculum, biology, chemistry, and physics.

Going into their junior year, students pick a career strand, or 'major', within one of four specialty areas:
Agricultural, Biological, and Health Sciences.
Applied Physical Sciences.
Computer Science and Mathematics.
Engineering Technology, which can include an Aviation Maintenance Program that lasts five years and is certified by the Federal Aviation Administration.

Partnerships with businesses
The school has partnerships with local businesses. Monsanto Company and two medical schools in St. Louis provide assistance and internships in the area of agricultural, health and biological sciences; Mallinckrodt Chemical, in physical sciences; McDonnell-Douglas, in engineering technology; and Lucent Technologies Bell Labs, as well as the computer divisions of Monsanto, Mallinckrodt Chemical, and McDonnell-Douglas, in computer science and mathematics. Lucent Technologies staff also help the students.

Alumni
 Sheldon Richardson - Minnesota Vikings (defensive tackle).
 Sam Scarber - San Diego Chargers (running back)
Dr. Joi Irving  Medical Doctor C/O 2000
Marlon S. Anderson, Esq.Missouri House of Representatives, Attorney. C/O 2000
 Pablo A person

References

Educational institutions established in 1992
High schools in St. Louis
Public high schools in Missouri
Magnet schools in Missouri
1992 establishments in Missouri
Buildings and structures in St. Louis